Gopinath Aman was an Indian independence activist, journalist and poet of Urdu literature. Born in 1899, He headed the Public Relations Committee of the Delhi administration in the 1950s. Bare Admiyon Ke Tanz O Mizah, Caurang, Aqidat ke phul; Gandhiji ki ḥayat aur shahadat par muk̲h̲talif shuʻarā ka muntak̲h̲ab-i kalam, Naz̲r-i aqīdat : shaʼir-i azam Rabindara Natha Ṭagore, Urdu aur usaka sahitya and Aqidat ke phul are some of his notable works.

Awards
 1997: The Government of India awarded Gopinath Aman the third highest civilian honour of the Padma Bhushan, in 1977, for his contributions to literature.

References

External links 
 

Recipients of the Padma Bhushan in literature & education
1899 births
Indian independence activists from Delhi
Indian male journalists
Indian male poets
Urdu-language poets from India
Poets from Delhi
Journalists from Delhi
20th-century Indian poets
20th-century Indian male writers
Year of death missing